The Sequatchie River is a  waterway that drains the Sequatchie Valley, a large valley in the Cumberland Plateau in Tennessee.  It empties into the Tennessee River downstream from Chattanooga near the Tennessee-Alabama state line.

Hydrography

The Sequatchie River originates from several springs at or near Devilstep Hollow Cave, including the spring, Head of the Sequatchie. Dye traces establish the origin of their water as originating from Grassy Cove, the pastoral limestone sinkhole located to the north-east.

The stream crosses into Bledsoe County near the head of the Sequatchie Valley.  The Sequatchie Valley is traversed throughout much its length by U.S. Route 127.  The first sizeable town on the Sequatchie is Pikeville, the county seat of Bledsoe. State Route 30, which descends Walden's Ridge into the Valley and then climbs the escarpment back onto the plateau, crosses here.

Crossing into Sequatchie County, the stream flows into Dunlap.  Just north of Dunlap, US 127 turns southeastward, beginning the ascent onto Walden Ridge and eventually down into Chattanooga. A set of railroad tracks previously ran along the river from this point, testament to heavy underground coal extraction in years past.  For almost the rest of its length the Sequatchie is paralleled by State Route 28. State Route 283 also runs along the base of the Walden's Ridge escarpment for several miles.  The river then enters Marion County. The town of Whitwell is just a few miles into Marion County.  Below Whitwell at the small community of Sequatchie (also known as Sequachee), the river receives the flow of the Little Sequatchie River, which descends from atop the Cumberland Plateau to the west.  At Jasper, which is slightly west of the river, is a railroad junction.  East of town is the crossing of U.S. Highway 41 by SR 28, and the bridge over the river.  Shortly south of the Interstate 24 bridge is the mouth of the Sequatchie into the Guntersville Lake impoundment of the Tennessee River.

See also
List of Tennessee rivers

References

External links

Rivers of Tennessee
Tributaries of the Tennessee River
Rivers of Bledsoe County, Tennessee
Rivers of Cumberland County, Tennessee
Rivers of Sequatchie County, Tennessee
Rivers of Marion County, Tennessee